The King of the Gilites (also spelled King of the Jil/Gil) was a title used by the rulers of Dakhel and its surroundings. The kingdom was mostly ruled by the Gilite Shahanshahvand clan.

Sources 
 
 

History of Gilan
Iranian dynasties